Tom Deckman is an American stage and screen actor.  He is a member of Actors' Equity Association.

He played The Historian, Not Dead Fred, French Guard, Minstrel, and Prince Herbert in the Broadway production of Monty Python's Spamalot.

He played Thurio and Cupid in Two Gentlemen of Verona (musical) at Shakespeare Theatre Company's Harman Hall (2012).  Previously, he played: on Broadway in Monty Python's Spamalot (Sam S. Shubert Theatre) and Good Vibrations (Eugene O'Neill Theatre); at Carnegie Hall in South Pacific in Concert (2005–2006); at City Center Encores! Bye Bye Birdie (musical) (2004); at New York's York Theatre in Best Foot Forward (Musicals in Mufti Concert, 2004).  He appeared in the world premiere of It Should Have Been You (directed by David Hyde Pierce) at the George Street Playhouse (2011), and at the New York City Opera in Dead Man Walking.  He also performed in Good Vibrations in regional theater (2004–2005). He has also appeared at the Downstairs Cabaret Theatre (in Grease), Goodspeed Opera House, Bay Street Theatre (Hair), Fulton Opera House (Into the Woods), and Orpheum Theatre (San Francisco) (White Christmas). He has been seen on television in Salon Confidential, Blue Bloods, Sex and the City, Law and Order: SVU, and Hope and Faith.

He also appeared in a teen.com web series, Haute and Bothered (2009).

Deckman performed Characters I coulda nailed! solo, once, July 5, 2010 at Pope Auditorium, Lincoln Center. It was to benefit the Fordham Alumni Theatre Company.

References

External links 

10 songs from Tom Deckman:  Roles I coulda nailed 5 July 2010 and 4 others (YouTube)

Living people
Male actors from Rochester, New York
1979 births
Fordham University alumni
Male actors from New York City